Cádiz Club de Fútbol, S.A.D., known simply as Cádiz, is a Spanish professional football club based in Cádiz, Andalusia.
Founded in 1910, the club competes in the La Liga, holding home games at Nuevo Mirandilla, with a seating capacity of 20,724.

Salvadoran legend Mágico González played for the club during the 1980s/1990s, and is widely recognized as the best player to ever play for the team.

Between 1929 and 1977, Cádiz played in either the second or third tier of Spanish football. In 1977, Cádiz achieved promotion to La Liga for the first time. Since then Cádiz has played fourteen seasons in the first tier, as well as spending several at the second level.

History
The first documented game of Cádiz CF was played against Cádiz Sporting Club on Thursday, 8 September 1910. Cádiz CF won it 1–0. Two days later on 10 September 1910, several Cádiz citizens appealed to Civil Government to register a club under the name Cádiz Foot-Ball Club. One of the founders was José Rivera y Lora, the first Cádiz president. A year later, in 1911, two other important events of Cádiz football took place: the foundation of the Español Foot-Ball Club and the inscription of Cádiz Foot-Ball Club to the Federación Sur (Southern Football Federation). The Civil War interrupted the organization of competitions and Cádiz CF only played friendly matches, among others, against teams such as Betis and Celta de Vigo.

Cádiz played the first complete season 1939–40 in Segunda División after the Spanish Civil War. The club finished 1st in the Group 5 with 11 wins in 14 games. That season the coach position was occupied by Santiago Núñez, who was also a player, and the key roles were played by Roldán, Díaz, Mateo, the goalkeeper Bueno, future Real Madrid player, and Camilo Liz, who decades later became the technical secretary of the club. During the following 3 seasons Cádiz was far away from repeating that success. Cádiz first reached La Liga in 1977–78, after having spent two decades in the second division. It took place on 5 June 1977, with a 2–0 victory at Ramón de Carranza against Tarrasa. Relegated after just one season, the club returned in 1980, managing a further 13-year stay. In August 1981, before returning to La Liga, Cádiz won its first Ramón de Carranza Trophy. They beat Sevilla (led by coach Miguel Muñoz) 1–0 with the goal scored by Dieguito. Among them there were such important players in Cádiz history as Bocoya, Juan José, Hugo Vaca, Dos Santos, Amarillo, Luque, Linares, Pepe Mejías, Dieguito (Escobar), López (Choquet) and Mané.

Often led by the skills of Salvadoran Mágico González, the club managed to maintain its top flight status in the 1990–91 season, thanks to youth graduate Kiko (and 25 minutes of his inspiration against Real Zaragoza), who picked up the offensive burden after González left. During the late 1980s and early 1990s the club became known as "The Yellow Submarine", due to its capacity of "coming afloat" every year at the end of each season and remain in the top division, despite having been "sunk down" during most of the campaign.

However, in just two seasons, Cádiz dropped down two levels. In 1995 Cádiz was on the brink of extinction due to financial issues. The investment group no longer invested in the club and declared the suspension of payments. A group of cadistas, headed by Antonio Muñoz and Manuel García, had the negotiations with the creditors, reorganized the club and started managing it directly from the city of Cádiz. After a long spell in Segunda División B the club was finally promoted in 2003, spectacularly returning to the top level in 2005, after taking the championship with a last-day victory at neighbours Xerez CD. The match was played on 18 June 2005, and ended up with 2–0 Cádiz win in the presence of 8000 Cádiz fans, arrived in Xerez.

However, Cádiz was eventually relegated back to the second tier, in the 37th and penultimate matchday of 2005–06. Cádiz finished in the 19th position, 4 points away from 16th place, which could secure the club a place in La Liga. For the following campaign, former Spanish international Oli took the reins of the team, being sacked after only a few months. With him the club won just 4 from 11 matches.

In June 2008, Cádiz dropped another level returning to the Segunda División B. However, after just one season, it managed to return to the second division, but was immediately relegated in the 2009–10 campaign. Cádiz finished in 19th place, falling just one point behind the teams in 17th and 18th positions, which guaranteed them a place in the Segunda División. Performance of such experienced players as Raúl López, Andrés Fleurquin and Enrique Ortiz was the major asset to the successful 2008–09 season. Cádiz became the champion of the Segunda División B, having a successful season with 24 wins, 7 draws, and 7 losses in 38 matches. 
During the 2015–16 the club finished its season in Group 4 in 4th place and qualified for the promotion playoffs, they beat Racing Ferrol, Racing Santander and Hércules and therefore promoted back to Segunda División after 6 years. The key match against Hércules took place on 26 June 2016, at the Ramón de Carranza stadium. Cádiz won it 1–0.

On 29 September 2019, Cádiz CF organized trials in Mumbai, India. For the second time, the club gave an opportunity to more than 250 Indian students to win a scholarship to live and train in Spain. As a result, three players were selected: Harshika Jain, Veer Gondal and Arnav Gorantala. Their stay in Spain began on January, 2020.

In the beginning of the 2019–20 season, Cádiz repeated its best start record as per first ten league games of a single season. This record dates 80 years back to the 1939–1940 season. Head coach Álvaro Cervera admitted the good start of the season and said:

On 28 December 2019, Manuel Vizcaíno Fernández was appointed as chairman of the board of directors for the next six years, along with the directors Jorge Cobo and Martín José García Marichal.

On 2 March 2020, Cádiz CF confirmed that an unnamed American investor of great economic strength became one of the club's shareholders. Despite acquiring a minority of shares, the investor's goal is expanding his presence in the club and helping the Andalusian club with the promotion to La Liga. The president of the club Manuel Vizcaíno revealed the plans of using new resources to modernize the infrastructure, facilities and other areas of the club.

On 12 July 2020, Cádiz CF was promoted back to the Primera División after 14 years. On 20 September 2020 Cádiz won its first La Liga match (2:0 away win over Huesca) since the previous campaign in the league. On 5 December, Cádiz CF won a home game for the first time in the season, setting another historic moment in the process: in fact, goals by Álvaro Giménez and Álvaro Negredo secured a 2–1 final result against Barcelona. Plus, on 21 February 2021, they managed to block Barcelona once again, as the match ended up in a 1–1 draw: a penalty by substitute Álex Fernández equalized the initial opener by Lionel Messi (also from the penalty spot).

On 4 April 2021 in a league game Mouctar Diakhaby of Valencia denounced an alleged racist aggression by Cádiz defender Juan Cala. The game was briefly halted after Valencia players walked off the pitch. The tests carried out by LaLiga and the RFEF showed that the complaint was false, so the judge declared Juan Cala innocent.

On 2 May 2021, Cádiz won 1–0 at Granada in Los Cármenes. With 40 points in the standings, Cádiz CF mathematically achieved survival in LaLiga Santander.

Season to season 

15 seasons in La Liga
40 seasons in Segunda División
16 seasons in Segunda División B
12 seasons in Tercera División
1 season in Categorías Regionales

Current squad 
.

Reserve team

Other players under contract

Out on loan

Current technical staff

Promotions and relegations
Promoted to Segunda División: 1935–36, 1954–55, 2002–03, 2008–09, 2015–2016
Relegated to Tercera División: 1942–43
Promoted to La Liga: 1976–77, 1980–81, 1982–83, 1984–85, 2004–05, 2019–20
Relegated to Segunda División: 1977–78, 1992–93, 2005–06
Relegated to Segunda División B: 1993–94, 2007–08, 2009–10

Stadium information
Name: Nuevo Mirandilla
City: Cádiz
Capacity: 25,033
Inauguration: 1955
Pitch size: 106 x 68 m

Famous players
Note: this list includes players that have appeared in at least 100 league games and/or have reached international status.

Coaches

Kit suppliers and shirt sponsors

References

External links

Official website 
Futbolme team profile 
Club history 

 
Football clubs in Andalusia
Association football clubs established in 1910
1910 establishments in Spain
La Liga clubs
Segunda División clubs